The BISU Visual Identity, or BISU Visual Identity System (VIS) is a set of coherent graphic styles that underlines the visual recognisability of Beijing International Studies University (BISU), providing clarity for the University's  graphic identity. The system was developed by the University Relations and was officially launched on 30 December 2003. In 2009, subtle improvements were made to the original design and guidelines to form the current visual system.

The BISU Visual Identity details the use of official colors, fonts, visual elements and other design practices related to visual interaction with the University.

Standards

BISU Maroon is the official color used in association with Beijing International Studies University. It is described as a brownish crimson and is accompanied by BISU Silver.
BISU Maroon is a CMYK color, the hexadecimal value of which is A8392A.

BISU Silver is described as a light grey and is used accompanied with BISU Maroon as the official color of Beijing International Studies University.
The hexadecimal value of BISU Silver is DCDDDE. It is a CMYK color.

Variations 

For qualitative visualisation on specific devices, it is possible to adapt the standard BISU Maroon and BISU Silver to specified alternative color spaces.
In addition, it is notable that BISU Maroon and BISU Silver are formally used by the school's academic and administrative units, different from the red and grey adopted by BISU Athletics.

There are two versions of BISU Athletics' uniforms, featured by red and grey respectively. While the red color in use is standardised as True Red, grey variations are not fixed, normally varying from a cadet grey to a Payne's grey.

Complementaries 

In addition to the two standard colors, the BISU Visual Identity also specifies two complementary colors in silver and gold used on formal occasions. Silver Complementary and Gold Complementary are Pantone colors. The color codes are PMS 877-C and PMS 873-C respectively.

See also
List of colors
 BISU Intellectual Property Guidelines

References

School colors
Beijing International Studies University